CVSO 30 (PTFO 8-8695) is a binary T Tauri star, located in constellation Orion at 1200 light years from Earth away with one candidate planet called CVSO 30 c. The candidate planet is a gas giant.

Planetary system 

CVSO 30 may have one planet called CVSO 30 c. CVSO 30 c is calculated to have a period of 27,000 years and a  semimajor axis of 660 AU.

Direct imaging of the suspected CVSO 30 c, with a calculated mass equal to 4.7 Jupiter's, has been achieved through photometric and spectroscopic high contrast observations carried out with the Very Large Telescope located in Chile, the Keck Observatory in Hawaii and the Calar Alto Observatory in Spain. However, the colors of the object suggest that it may actually be a background star, such as a K-type giant or a M-type subdwarf.

By 2020, the phase of "dips" caused by suspected planet CVSO 30 b had drifted nearly 180 degrees from the expected value, thus ruling out the existence of the planet. Instead, a rare type of stellar starspot activity with very large starspots is now suspected. Also, CVSO 30 is suspected to be a stellar binary, with the previously reported planetary orbital period equal to the rotation period of the companion star. Further investigation of "dips" by 2022 led to hypothesis of a large dust cloud close to synchronous orbit.

References

Further reading
 
 

T Tauri stars
Orion (constellation)
Hypothetical planetary systems
J05250755+0134243